The Roosevelt Institute is a liberal American think tank. According to the organization, it exists "to carry forward the legacy and values of Franklin and Eleanor Roosevelt by developing progressive ideas and bold leadership in the service of restoring America’s promise of opportunity for all." It is headquartered in New York City.

History and overview

The Roosevelt Institute was created in 1987 through the merger of the Eleanor Roosevelt Institute and the Franklin D. Roosevelt Four Freedoms Foundation. In 2007, the Roosevelt Institute merged with the Roosevelt Institution, now known as the Roosevelt Institute Campus Network. It remains the non-profit partner to the government-run Franklin D. Roosevelt Presidential Library and Museum, the nation's first presidential library. In 2009, it expanded its mission with the launch of the Four Freedoms Center, a progressive policy think tank, and an economic policy blog.

Felicia Wong, formerly of the Democracy Alliance, became the organization's president and CEO in March 2012. In 2015, the Roosevelt Institute was added to the Democracy Alliance's list of recommended funding targets. Other donors to the Roosevelt Institute include the Ford Foundation, the William and Flora Hewlett Foundation, the MacArthur Foundation, and the Bauman Foundation.

Activities
Joseph Stiglitz is the Roosevelt Institute's chief economist. In 2015, a report authored by Stiglitz offered an indictment of 35 years of U.S. economic policies. Elizabeth Warren and Bill de Blasio joined Stiglitz at the press conference to announce the report. The 37 policy recommendations in the Stiglitz report include progressive taxation and an expansion of government programs.

Time called the Stiglitz report "a roadmap for what many progressives would like to see happen policy wise over the next four years." According to The Washington Post, the institute's plan is "firmly rooted in the conviction that more government can solve most of America's economic challenges. It is a plan seemingly designed to rally liberals, enrage free-market economists and push a certain presumptive presidential nominee to the left."

See also
 Four Freedoms Award

References

External links
 Official website

Political and economic think tanks in the United States
Progressive organizations in the United States
Franklin D. Roosevelt
American political blogs
Organizations established in 1987
1987 establishments in New York (state)
Eleanor Roosevelt